Josef Kubásek  (born 6 May 1985 in Polička) is a Czech footballer who plays for FK Mladá Boleslav. He has represented his country at under-21 level.

References

External links
 
 

1985 births
Living people
People from Polička
Czech footballers
Czech Republic under-21 international footballers
Czech First League players
FK Baník Sokolov players
SK Slavia Prague players
FK Mladá Boleslav players
1. FC Slovácko players
FK Baník Most players
Association football goalkeepers
Sportspeople from the Pardubice Region